Piala Indonesia ( 'Indonesia Cup') is the professional annual cup competition for football clubs in Indonesia. Originally, it started from the semi-professional football era in 1985 as Piala Liga, which ran until 1989 under Galatama competition. The Football Association of Indonesia (PSSI) organized the full professional cup competition from 2005 until now. Traditionally, the tournament involves all the clubs from the whole layers in football competitions in Indonesia, which are Liga 1, Liga 2, and Liga 3.

The competition was founded in 2005. Piala Indonesia winners qualify for the AFC Cup the following season.

Sriwijaya is the most successful club in the competition with three titles.

The tournament has not been held on several occasions: 2009, 2011, 2013–2017 (partially due to the PSSI's ban on handling all of the football competitions by FIFA in 2015–16), and 2020–2022 (due to the COVID-19 pandemic in Indonesia).

History
Originally, the competition started from the semi-professional football era in 1985 as Piala Liga (English: League Cup), which ran until 1989 under Galatama competition. It started again in 1992 and 1994 as Piala Galatama (English: Galatama Cup).

PSSI started the professional cup competition in 2005, initially under the name of Copa Dji Sam Soe Indonesia until 2009 for sponsorship reasons, after which the name of the tournament was changed to the Piala Indonesia. In 2012, after a one-year hiatus, the Indonesian football "dualism" meant only Liga Prima Indonesia (LPI) clubs competed; Persibo Bojonegoro won that year's Indonesia Cup.

The competition returned after six years for the 2018–19 edition, when Kratingdaeng was the title sponsor of Piala Indonesia. The 2020 tournament was cancelled due to the COVID-19 pandemic in Indonesia.

The tournament will return for the 2022–23 edition after a two-year hiatus due to the COVID-19 pandemic; it was originally supposed to be cancelled but it was kept taking place. A new sponsor has yet to be announced.

List of finals

Piala Liga

Piala Galatama

Copa Indonesia

Piala Indonesia

Performances

Awards

Top goal-scorers

Best players

Title sponsor

Broadcasters

Indonesia 

Notes:

Worldwide

See also
List of football clubs in Indonesia by major honours won
 Indonesian Community Shield
 Indonesia President's Cup

References

External links
Piala Indonesia on RSSSF
Indonesian Football League Official Site
PSSI Official Site
Dji Sam Soe 234 Official Site
PT Philip Morris International Indonesia Tbk Official Site

 
1
National association football cups